"Toxic" is a song recorded by American singer Britney Spears for her fourth studio album, In the Zone (2003). It was written and produced by Bloodshy & Avant, with additional writing from Cathy Dennis and Henrik Jonback. Released as the second single from In the Zone, the song was initially offered to Kylie Minogue for her album Body Language, but she turned it down. After trying to choose between "(I Got That) Boom Boom" and "Outrageous" to be the second single, Spears selected "Toxic" instead. A dance-pop and techno-pop song with elements of bhangra music, "Toxic" features varied instrumentation, such as drums, synthesizers and surf guitar. It is accompanied by breathy vocals and high-pitched Bollywood strings, sampled from Laxmikant–Pyarelal's "Tere Mere Beech Mein" (1981). Its lyrics draw an extended metaphor of a lover as a dangerous and addictive drug.

"Toxic" received widespread acclaim from music critics, who praised its hook and chorus with many deeming it among the highlights of the album. It won Best Dance Recording at the 47th Annual Grammy Awards, marking the first Grammy win of Spears' career. The song was a worldwide success, topping the charts in ten countries including Australia, Canada, Hungary, Ireland, Norway and the United Kingdom, and reached the top five in fifteen countries. In the United States, it became her fourth top-ten single, peaking at number nine. The accompanying music video for "Toxic" was directed by Joseph Kahn and includes references to Blade Runner, The Seven Year Itch and John Woo films. It features Spears as a secret agent in search of a vial of green liquid. After she steals it, she enters an apartment and poisons her boyfriend. The video also includes interspersed scenes of Spears naked with diamonds on her body, which as a result of the Super Bowl XXXVIII halftime show controversy, was deemed too racy for MTV and was moved to late-night programming.

Spears has performed "Toxic" in live appearances, including the 2004 NRJ Music Awards and three of her concert tours. It was the opening number of the Onyx Hotel Tour (2004), where she sang atop a bus wearing a black catsuit; Spears also performed remixed versions of "Toxic" at the Circus Starring Britney Spears (2009), the Femme Fatale Tour (2011) and Britney: Piece of Me (2013). "Toxic" has been covered by artists such as Mark Ronson, A Static Lullaby, Reece Mastin and Ingrid Michaelson, and in the TV series Glee. It has also featured in films such as Knocked Up, You Again and  Pitch Perfect 3, and TV series Doctor Who and Chuck. Since its release, "Toxic" has become one of Spears' signature songs and is widely cited among the most influential and innovative songs in pop music history. The song has been included in multiple all-time lists of best songs, including by Pitchfork, NME and, in 2021, was ranked among Rolling Stones 500 Greatest Songs of All Time.

Background
"Toxic" was written by Cathy Dennis, Henrik Jonback, Christian Karlsson, and Pontus Winnberg from production team Bloodshy & Avant, while produced by the latter two. The song was written with Janet Jackson in mind, but was initially offered to Kylie Minogue for recording, who turned it down and it eventually was recorded by Spears. "Toxic" was recorded at Murlyn Studios in Stockholm, Sweden, and Record Plant in Los Angeles. The song was later mixed by Niklas Flyckt at Khabang Studios in Stockholm; he won the 2004 Grammy for Best Dance Recording.

In December 2003, it was announced by MTV News that after trying to choose between "(I Got That) Boom Boom" and "Outrageous" to be the second single from In the Zone, Spears had selected "Toxic" instead. She described it as "an upbeat song. It's really different, that's why I like it so much."

Composition

"Toxic" is a classic dance-pop and techno-pop song, featuring elements of bhangra music. It features varied instrumentation, such as drums, synthesizers, violins, and high-pitched strings. It also contains surf guitar, that according to Caryn Ganz of Spin, "warps and struts like it's been fed into The Matrix." The music was also compared to the soundtracks of the James Bond film series. The hook of "Toxic" samples a portion of "Tere Mere Beech Mein", from the soundtrack of the 1981 Bollywood film Ek Duuje Ke Liye. However, it is not lifted verbatim from the score and mixes two different sections of the piece for the introduction section; later in the song, the cut-up sample is dropped in favor of a re-recorded string arrangement to improve the quality of the melody as evidenced by the multitrack recordings available on the internet. Spears' vocals on the song are breathy. Some of the refrains were inspired by pieces of classical music, such as "Flight of the Bumblebee", "Eine kleine Nachtmusik", and "Dumky Trio". NME described the song as presenting "piercing strings, hip-hop beats, eastern flavour and a dangerous escapade with temptation."

According to the sheet music published at MusicNotes, "Toxic" is composed in the key of C minor, with a tempo of 143 beats per minute. Spears's vocal range spans from the low note of F3 to the high note of F5. Lyrically, "Toxic" talks about being addicted to a lover. Spears refers to her addiction in the lyrics and sings lines such as "Too high / Can't come down / Losing my head / Spinning round and round" in a falsetto. A reviewer from Popdust called the verse "The most representative lyric of the song's delirious, disorienting charm." "Toxic" ends with an outro in which Spears sings the lines, "Intoxicate me now / With your lovin' now / I think I'm ready now." Nick Southall of Stylus Magazine said the lyrics made Spears sound afraid of sex.

Critical reception

"Toxic" has been met with widespread acclaim from music critics. Heather Richels of The Paly Voice complimented its hook and catchiness while deeming it the most appealing song on In the Zone. While reviewing The Onyx Hotel Tour, Pamela Sitt of The Seattle Times called it the album's strongest single. Eric Olsen of Today stated the song could be the biggest hit off of its parent album while calling it "powerfully addicting." Caryn Ganz of Spin commented, "Spears hits pay dirt on 'Toxic'". Christy Lemire of Associated Press stated it was one of Spears' greatest hits and deemed it "insanely catchy", remarking that the chorus alone "makes you want to forgive the Alias wannabe video that accompanies the song." Stephen Thomas Erlewine of Allmusic called it along with "Showdown", "irresistible ear candy in what is surely Britney's most ambitious, adventurous album to date". In a separate review of Spears' greatest hits album Greatest Hits: My Prerogative (2004), Erlewine selected it as one of the "track picks" and described it as "a delirious, intoxicating rush". Jeffrey Epstein of Out compared the innovative sound of "Toxic" to Madonna's "Vogue".

Sal Cinquemani of Slant Magazine said that "Toxic" and "(I Got That) Boom Boom", "find Britney dabbling in hip-hop, but it's clear her heart lies in the clubs." Jamie Gill of Yahoo! Music Radio commented, "In the name of fairness, it will be noted that 'Toxic' and 'Showdown' could well have been good pop songs in the hands of any other singer than Spears." Joan Anderman of The Boston Globe named it "a well-titled cascade of frantic, mechanized glissandos and dreadful canned strings that buries the album's coolest (only?) chorus under a joyless mass". The song was ranked at number five in the 2004 Pazz & Jop poll by The Village Voice. "Toxic" was nominated for Best Song at the 2004 MTV Europe Music Awards, but lost to Outkast's "Hey Ya!". However, it won Best Dance Recording at the 2004 Grammy Awards, making it her first-ever won Grammy. It won Best Single at the 2004 Teen Choice Awards. Pitchfork listed the song at number three on their Top 50 Singles of 2004 list. Rob Mitchum commented that Spears "finally, she just acted like an adult, rather than constantly reminding us she wasn't a girl anymore."

Chart performance

"Toxic" entered at number 53 on the Billboard Hot 100 on the issue dated January 31, 2004. It became the week's "Highest Debut". On March 27, 2004, it peaked at number nine; it was her fourth single to reach the top-ten and became her first single to reach the top ten since "Oops!... I Did It Again" in 2000. "Toxic" also topped both the Pop Songs and Hot Dance Club Songs charts. On October 25, 2004, the song was certified gold by the Recording Industry Association of America (RIAA) for sales of 500,000 copies. As of March 2015, "Toxic" has sold 2.2 million digital downloads in the United States, according to Nielsen SoundScan. It is her fifth best-selling digital single in the country. The song also topped the Canadian Singles Chart. "Toxic" debuted at the top of the Australian charts on March 15, 2004, and stayed in the position for two weeks. The song received a gold certification by the Australian Recording Industry Association (ARIA) for shipments over 35,000 units.

In New Zealand, "Toxic" debuted at number 38 on the issue dated February 16, 2004, and peaked at number two on March 29, 2004. It stayed at the position the following week, held off from the top spot by Eamon's "Fuck It (I Don't Want You Back)". On March 7, 2004, "Toxic" debuted at number one on the UK Singles Chart for the week ending date March 13, 2004, becoming her fourth number-one hit in the United Kingdom. In April 2004, it was certified silver by the British Phonographic Industry (BPI), with sales over 200,000 copies. According to the Official Charts Company, the song has sold 426,000 copies there. "Toxic" also peaked inside the top-ten in every country it charted. The song topped the charts in Hungary and Norway; reached the top five in Austria, Czech Republic, Denmark, Germany, Portugal, Italy, France, Sweden and Switzerland; and the top ten in Belgium (Flanders and Wallonia), Finland, and the Netherlands. "Toxic" is Spears' most streamed single in the US, with over 448 million streams as of June 2020.

Music video

Development and release

The music video for "Toxic" was filmed on a soundstage in Los Angeles. It was directed by Joseph Kahn, who had previously worked with Spears on the music video for her 2000 single "Stronger". The editor of the video was David Blackburn, who also edited "Womanizer" and "Do Somethin'. Brad Rushing was the cinematographer. Spears first approached Kahn with a story sketch of a secret agent out for revenge against an ex-lover, for which Kahn created a treatment. Her concept was almost fully formed and detailed, including for example the scene in which she drops a drink on the passenger's lap. Spears said she wanted to join the mile high club and be a stewardess that kissed a man in the bathroom. Kahn suggested making him a fat man, so the "common man" would feel represented. Spears also told him about a scene in which she would be naked and covered in diamonds. Kahn stated he was "not sure what I was thinking about when she told me about that scene, maybe those intros to James Bond movies, but every video needs an iconic image to remember, and that's it." The choreography was a collaboration between Brian Friedman and Spears, and every scene had a completely different, strictly structured routine. After the treatment was finished, Kahn proceeded to cast his friends and acquaintances, as in most of his projects. The plane passenger on whom Spears drops a drink was played by his longtime casting director, while the fat man in the bathroom was played by the casting director's assistant. Spears's ex-boyfriend is played by Martin Henderson, who starred in Kahn's directorial debut Torque.

For the naked scenes, Spears cleared the set, leaving only Kahn, Blackburn, and Rushing with her to shoot the sequence. Spears also shot scenes in which she had to dance through a hallway of imaginary lasers in front of a green screen, something that Kahn deemed as "incredible to watch". The last few scenes of the video in which Spears murders her boyfriend concerned Kahn, who thought they would be censored. He explained, "the trick was to make it look pop at the same time" and told Henderson, "Would you like to be kissed by Britney Spears?". According to Kahn, the hint of a smile that appears on Henderson's face before Spears pours the poison into his mouth was what managed to get the shot past the censors. Although Spears was at first going to be involved in the editing process with Blackburn, she did not contact Kahn after the media scandal over her wedding in Las Vegas. "Toxic" was Spears's most expensive music video to that point, at the cost of $1 million. The music video premiered exclusively on MTV's Making the Video on January 13, 2004. The following day, Spears appeared on TRL to premiere it on regular rotation. The video was first released on the Britney Spears: In the Zone video album. An alternate karaoke version featuring the diamonds scene was released on the Greatest Hits: My Prerogative DVD.

Synopsis

The music video begins with an open shot of an airplane flying and preceded by three menacing dark birds, referencing the works of Hong Kong director John Woo. Spears appears with blonde hair dressed as a flight attendant, lifting the in-flight intercom as if on a phone call. After serving some of the passengers, she "accidentally" spills a drink into the lap of a seated male passenger; later beckoning a middle-aged, overweight, bespectacled male passenger to the bathroom where she seduces him. She peels off the man's mask to reveal an attractive man (Matthew Felker) underneath it and steals a black pass from his pocket as they passionately kiss. Spears then appears, completely re-dressed and with red hair, standing in a futuristic Paris, similar to the film Blade Runner (1982), and takes a ride on the back of a Ducati 999, driven by a shirtless male (Tyson Beckford). She wears a tight black catsuit and sports red hair, inspired by the character of Sydney Bristow from the television series Alias. As they speed past a woman, the draft from the motorcycle lifts up her dress, a homage to the iconic Marilyn Monroe scene in the film The Seven Year Itch (1955). They also pass two women, erotically frolicking in a store window.

The action narrative is repeatedly intercut with scenes of Spears, on all fours on the floor, wearing a sheer bodysuit covered in diamonds. The look was compared to that of Kate Bush in the music video for her 1978 single, "The Man with the Child in His Eyes". Spears then enters Toxic Industries and gains access to a vault from which she steals a vial of green poison. As she leaves, she accidentally triggers a Mission: Impossible-style laser trap, which she evades with elaborate dance moves, including a back handspring. Scenes are intercut of Spears' ex-boyfriend (Henderson) making out with another woman in the shower. Spears, now dressed as a black-haired super-heroine, scales a building and enters an apartment, where her ex-boyfriend is waiting for his lover who is in the shower. She pummels him to the floor and kisses him just before pouring the poison into his mouth, killing him. Spears kisses him again and flies from the window balcony. She appears back on the plane as the flight attendant and winks at the camera. The video ends with a shot of the airplane flying off, through clouds, towards the sun, followed by five menacing screeching blackbirds, as seen at the beginning.

Response and impact
Jennifer Vineyard of MTV compared the video to Justin Timberlake's "Cry Me a River", saying that "Where her real-life ex just stalked his cheating lover in his clip, [...] Spears takes a more lethal approach." On February 10, 2004, MTV announced that due to the Super Bowl XXXVIII halftime show controversy in which Janet Jackson's breast was exposed on live television, "Toxic" along with other five music videos would be moved from daytime to late-night programming from 10 p.m. until 6 a.m. A spokeswoman for MTV announced that "given the particular sensitivity in the culture right now, we're erring on the side of caution for the immediate future." The video was nominated at the 2004 MuchMusic Video Awards in the category of Best International Artist Video, but lost to Beyoncé's "Crazy in Love". It was also nominated for four VMAs at the 2004 awards in the categories of Best Female Video, Best Dance Video, Best Pop Video and Video of the Year, but lost all of them (Rumors spread on internet forums claiming the other winners were rigged due to her non-presence that year). Corey Moss of MTV said that Spears "remains the Susan Lucci of the VMAs." Visual effects supervisors Chris Watts and Bert Yukich won the category of Outstanding Visual Effects in a Music Video at the 3rd Annual Visual Effects Society Awards.

In September 2009, the music video for "Toxic" was voted by users of the music video website MUZU TV as the sexiest music video. The video was also used on Life Is Pornography, a 2005 video art by Jubal Brown. Amy Schriefer of NPR noted that in the video, Spears was no longer trying to break away from her 1990s teen pop image and style; she was comfortable and having fun, not trying to generate any type of calculated controversy. The anime music video for Spears's single "Break the Ice" (2008) was based on the secret agent character of "Toxic". The video for "Womanizer" (2008) was created by Spears as a sequel to "Toxic". In the 2010 Glee episode "Britney/Brittany", the character of Brittany Pierce danced in a diamond suit during a cover of "I'm a Slave 4 U". In a 2011 poll by Billboard, the song's music video was voted the second-best music video of the 2000s, behind only Lady Gaga's "Bad Romance" (2009). Jillian Mapes of Billboard wrote that Spears "proved that she comes in every flavor [...] But the one role that stays constant through the dance-heavy clip: Sultry maneater." Taylor Swift's "Bad Blood" music video pays homage to the red-haired look Spears sports in the "Toxic" music video. Many comparisons were made about the similarities.

"Toxic" is still widely credited for changing the face of dance-pop in the 2000s. It introduced an influx of electropop into the modern market, providing the blueprint for various smash hits. As of February , the music video of "Toxic" has over 590 million views on YouTube.

Live performances

"Toxic" was performed by Spears at Britney Spears: In the Zone, a concert special that aired in ABC on November 17, 2003. She also performed "Toxic" as the headliner of the Jingle Ball on December 8, 2003, at Staples Center. It was the opening number of her set, and Spears appeared wearing a black top and a white fur cape. While the choreography was deemed as "erotic", Corey Moss of MTV commented that some of the effect was lost due to Spears's lip-synching and a stagehand fixing a prop during the song. On January 24, 2004, Spears opened the 2004 NRJ Music Awards with a performance of "Toxic". During the ceremony, she also presented the NRJ Award of Honor for the Career to Madonna. Spears performed "Toxic" as the opening number of 2004's the Onyx Hotel Tour. Previous to the beginning of the tour, she deemed it as the song she was most excited to perform, along with "Everytime". After an introduction in which she briefly appeared on a large video screen, Spears took the stage standing on top of a hotel bus, wearing a tight black catsuit. She was surrounded by dancers dressed as employees and columns of LED lighting, suggesting the façade of a glitzy hotel on the Vegas Strip. MTV UK commented, "OK, so she doesn't so much sing than mime along with Toxic, [...] But what do you expect when she's simultaneously performing a vigorous dance routine, ascending moving staircases and descending fireman poles?".

"Toxic" was also performed as the last song of the concert during the M+M's Tour. After "Do Somethin'", in which Spears wore a hot pink bra, a white fur coat, and a jean skirt, she ended the set with "Toxic", with four female dancers in a Shakira-like style. Following the performance, she thanked the audience and introduced her dancers. "Toxic" was also performed at 2009's the Circus Starring Britney Spears. Following an interlude in which the dancers showcased their individual moves, the stage was lit with green sci-fi effects, and Spears appeared over moving jungle gyms. Jerry Shriver of USA Today said that "fan-favorite Toxic [...] succeeded because the focus was solely on the star." Jane Stevenson of the Toronto Sun named it one of the standout performances of the show, along with "...Baby One More Time" and "Womanizer". Screen commented, "The high point of the show was the back to back performance of two of Britney's biggest hits, 'Toxic' and 'Baby One More Time' [sic], which had the crowd break out in wild applause."

The song was performed at 2011's Femme Fatale Tour. After a video intermission in which Spears finds and captures the stalker that follows her, the show continues with a martial arts-inspired remix of "Toxic", in which Spears wears a kimono and battles dancing ninjas. Keith Caufield of Billboard felt the performance was comparable to Madonna's "Sky Fits Heaven" at 2001's Drowned World Tour. Shirley Halperin of The Hollywood Reporter stated that "[the] mid-tempo numbers [...] seemed to stall out quickly, where faster offerings like 'Womanizer,' 'I Wanna Go' and 'Toxic' had the sold-out crowd jumping in place and pumping their number twos in the air." August Brown of the Los Angeles Times said, "The set's only weak spots were sonic revisions of catalog staples – the Bollywood spy-flick vamp of 'Toxic' remains utterly groundbreaking and didn’t need an Ibiza-inspired revision.". Spears performed the song during the last act from her 2013-17 Las Vegas residency Britney: Piece of Me. The number begins with a ballad version of "Toxic" and Spears is seen over a giant tree. Before the chorus begins, Spears jumps from the tree in a kind of bungee jump under a water curtain. As Spears lands in the stage, the first chords from the song starts and the performance keeps going on. In the 2016 Billboard Music Awards, it was performed as the closing song of a greatest hits medley by Spears, with brand new choreography. The song was also included in Spears's setlist for the iHeartRadio Music Festival on September 24, 2016. Spears performed the song as part of her Apple Music Festival performance in London on September 27, 2016.  The song was also streamed live along with "Work Bitch" from Spears' final Britney: Piece of Me show date on December 31, 2017, on ABC's Dick Clark's New Year's Rockin' Eve to a record audience of 25.6 million.

Legacy

"Toxic" won Spears her first, and to date only, Grammy Award at the 2005 ceremony in the Best Dance Recording category and gained her credibility amongst critics. The song also won Most Performed Work at the 2004 Ivor Novello Awards. "Toxic" was ranked at number fourteen on Stylus Magazines Top 50 Singles between 2000 and 2005. In a 2005 poll conducted by Sony Ericsson, "Toxic" was ranked as the world's second favorite song, only behind "We Are the Champions" by Queen. Over 700,000 people in 60 countries cast their votes. The song was also included on The 500 Greatest Songs Since You Were Born list by Blender. Pitchfork listed the song on The Top 500 Tracks of the 2000s. Jess Harvell commented that Spears had great pop instincts and that "Toxic" showed how "Britney always had more individualist pep than her peers, important when you're dealing with steamroller productions from the mind of Max Martin."

In 2009, NPR included "Toxic" on their Most Important Recordings of the Decade list. Amy Schriefer noted that the song's synths defined the sound of dance-pop for the rest of the decade while adding that it "still sound[s] fresh and futuristic." "Toxic" was listed on several others end of the decade lists; at number forty-seven by NME, forty-four by Rolling Stone and seventeen on The Daily Telegraph. NME called it the soundtrack to all of the fun of the decade, from "little girls at discos" to "gay clubs and hen nights." NME critics also ranked "Toxic" at number 92 on their 500 Greatest Songs list, writing that the song "reinvented popular dance music." In 2010, the song was voted in Rolling Stones end of the decade readers poll as the fourth-best single of the decade. In 2021, the song was ranked at number 114 on the list of Rolling Stone's 500 Greatest Songs of All Time. Pitchfork listed the song at number three on their Top 50 Singles of 2004 list. Bill Lamb of About.com listed the song at number 27 on the Top 40 Pop Songs. Evan Sawdey of PopMatters commented that "Toxic" is a rare kind of song that transcends genre boundaries, and added that Spears delivered the track that defined her legacy. In May 2010, Spears revealed via Twitter that "Toxic" is her favorite song in her catalog. In 2022, in their ranking of every Spears' song, Rolling Stone ranked "Toxic" at number one.

Awards

Homage
Ken Freedman devoted an entire three-hour radio show to cover versions of the song. It aired on WFMU on June 9, 2021.

Usage in media

Cover versions

The song was covered on the 2010 American series Glee episode "Britney/Brittany" by New Directions, in a Bob Fosse-inspired performance led by the character of Will Schuester. In the United States, their version debuted at number sixteen on the Hot 100 and sold 109,000 copies on its first week, according to Nielsen SoundScan. It also charted at number thirty-seven in Australia, fifteen in Canada, and seventeen in Ireland. The song was covered again in Glee episode "100" by Dianna Agron, Heather Morris, and Naya Rivera. Northern Irish singer-songwriter Juliet Turner covered "Toxic" for the 2004 covers compilation, Even Better Than the Real Thing Vol. 2. In 2005, American folk group Chapin Sisters recorded an acoustic cover of "Toxic", which was featured on PerezHilton.com and became one of the most requested songs of the year in KCRW. German country-rock band the BossHoss recorded a cover of "Toxic" for their debut album, Internashville Urban Hymns (2005). American rock duo Local H covered the song for their first live album, Alive '05 (2005). An instrumental rendition of the song was released by American surf rock band Monsters from Mars. Norwegian alternative rock band Hurra Torpedo covered "Toxic" in their fourth release, Kollossus of Makedonia (2006). English producer Mark Ronson recorded a hip hop cover of the song, featuring American singer-songwriter Tiggers and a posthumous verse from American rapper Ol' Dirty Bastard. It was included in his second studio album, Version (2007).

English indie rock band Hard-Fi covered the song for the compilation album Radio 1 Established 1967 (2007). The song was fused with the Clash's cover of "Brand New Cadillac". American musician Shawn Lee covered the song in the album Shawn Lee's Ping Pong Orchestra (2007). French-Israeli singer-songwriter Yael Naïm released a piano-driven version of the song in her eponymous debut album (2007). British electronic music group Metronomy's cover was described as "something out of a 'Weird Al' Yankovic polka medley, only not kidding." Israeli pop singer Shiri Maimon recorded a version of "Toxic" in Hebrew. American comedy singer Richard Cheese recorded a cover for his eighth album, Viva la Vodka (2009). American post-hardcore band A Static Lullaby released a cover in the compilation album, Punk Goes Pop 2 (2009). A music video was released, which featured different Spears look-alikes wearing iconic outfits from various music videos, such as "...Baby One More Time" and "Womanizer".

A cover of the song by American singer-songwriter Christopher Dallman was included in an EP titled Sad Britney, released on November 9, 2009, along with covers of "...Baby One More Time", "Gimme More" and "Radar". American acoustic trio Nickel Creek covered "Toxic" at the 2006 Bonnaroo Music Festival. Australian singer-songwriter Kate Miller-Heidke did an opera-pop version of "Toxic" during a mobile phone launch in Sydney in August 2007. She dedicated it to Spears, adding, "She's going through a bit of a hard time at the moment. ... This one's for you, mate."
American singer-songwriter Ingrid Michaelson covered "Toxic" regularly on her 2010 Everybody Tour. A cover version by The Hit Crew was used in Just Dance 2. Michaelson's version ends with her and the band doing a dance break set to Spears's original song. American pop band Selena Gomez & the Scene performed a tribute to Spears during their 2011 We Own the Night Tour. The medley of hits included "...Baby One More Time", "(You Drive Me) Crazy", "Oops!... I Did It Again", "I'm a Slave 4 U" and "Toxic", mixed similar to the Chris Cox Megamix included in Greatest Hits: My Prerogative. They also performed a cover of "Hold It Against Me". During her debut on American TV singing show The Voice, American singer Melanie Martinez sang "Toxic" playing an acoustic guitar and a tambourine with her foot. Three of the judges, Adam Levine, CeeLo Green, and Blake Shelton, hit the "I Want You" button for her. In 2014 David J covered "Toxic" featuring Sasha Grey. On December 2, 2016, Madonna covered the song during a live concert broadcast through Facebook Live.

The song was also covered in 2019 by Scottish singer Nina Nesbitt and the Queercore band Dog Park Dissidents. The song is also included in the "Backstage Romance" number of Moulin Rouge!, where it is sung in a medley with "Bad Romance", "Tainted Love", "Seven Nation Army", and "Sweet Dreams (Are Made of This)".

In 2021, the duo Altégo posted a snippet of a mashup of "Toxic" and Ginuwine's "Pony" on TikTok, that quickly went viral. In January 2022, the mashup was completed and officially released through Sony Music Entertainment under the title "Toxic Pony", being credited to Altégo, Spears and Ginuwine. The mashup reached number 40 on the Billboard Pop Airplay chart. English singer Mabel recorded an acoustic version of "Toxic" for the Apple Music edition of her second studio album, About Last Night... (2022). In 2022, spanish singer Lola Indigo covered the song during her Teatro Eslava Madrid concert.

Soundtrack appearances
In the 2005 episode "The End of the World" of the TV show Doctor Who, the character of Cassandra unveils an ancient jukebox that reproduced "Toxic" as an example of "a traditional ballad" from about 5 billion years prior. NME stated that the inclusion of the song marked its cultural impact. In the 2007 film Knocked Up, the song is played when Seth Rogen and Paul Rudd are driving to Las Vegas. Director Judd Apatow explained that he initially tried to use "Toxic" in the 2005 film The 40-Year-Old Virgin in the scene where Leslie Mann is drunk driving. "Toxic" was also featured in the 2010 film You Again. A string arrangement of "Toxic" was featured in the 2020 American thriller film Promising Young Woman, with film score producer Anthony Willis saying that Toxic' is one of the greatest pop songs of the [2000s]. It's such a fantastic track and has such an evocative lyric. And so if you hear that riff and you hear that tune, you're imagining the word 'toxic,' but you're not actually hearing it." "Toxic" is featured on British soap opera Emmerdale in July 2021 when Meena Jutla (Paige Sandhu) dances to the song after she murders Leanna Cavanagh (Mimi Slinger). "Toxic" was remixed with Elvis Presley's "Viva Las Vegas for Baz Luhrmann's Elvis and he planed on releasing it in late 2022. It came out on January 6, 2023 as "Toxic Las Vegas", a remix created by Jamieson Shaw. "Toxic" was featured on Just Dance 2023 Edition, using the original version of the song instead of The Hit Crew's cover that was used in Just Dance 2 previously.

Track listings

 European CD single
 "Toxic" (album version) – 3:19
 "Toxic" (instrumental) – 3:19

 German CD single
 "Toxic" – 3:21
 "Me Against the Music" (LP version / video mix) – 3:44

 Australian and European CD maxi single
 "Toxic" (album version) – 3:21
 "Toxic" (album instrumental) – 3:19
 "Toxic" (Bloodshy & Avant's intoxicated remix) – 5:35
 "Toxic" (Armand Van Helden remix edit) – 6:25

 Japanese CD maxi single
 "Toxic" (album version) – 3:21
 "Toxic" (album instrumental) – 3:19
 "Toxic" (Bloodshy & Avant remix) – 5:35
 "Me Against the Music" (Gabriel & Dresden radio edit) – 3:38

 UK CD maxi single
 "Toxic" (album version) – 3:21
 "Toxic" (Lenny Bertoldo mix show edit) – 5:46
 "Toxic" (Armand Van Helden remix edit) – 6:25
 "Toxic" (Felix Da Housecat's club mix) – 7:09
 "Toxic" (album mix instrumental) – 3:19

 DVD single
 "Toxic" – 3:21
 "In the Zone Special" – 4:50
 "Toxic" (Lenny Bertoldo mix show edit) – 5:46

 UK 12-inch vinyl
 "Toxic" – 3:21
 "Toxic" (Felix Da Housecat's club mix) – 7:09
 "Toxic" (Armand Van Helden remix – edit) – 6:25
 "Toxic" (Lenny Bertoldo mix show edit) – 5:46

US 12-inch vinyl and digital three-track remix maxi single
 "Toxic" (Armand Van Helden remix) – 9:34
 "Toxic" (Felix Da Housecat's club mix) – 7:09
 "Toxic" (Lenny Bertoldo mix show edit) – 5:46

Credits and personnel
Credits are adapted from the liner notes of In the Zone.

Recording and management
 Recorded at Murlyn Studios, (Stockholm, Sweden) and Record Plant Studios (Hollywood, Los Angeles, California)
 Mixed at Khabang Studio (Stockholm, Sweden)
 Mastered at Sterling Sound (New York City, New York)
 Colgems-EMI Music Incorporated, EMI Music Publishing Ltd. and Murlyn Songs AB, administered by Universal-Polygram Int. Publishing Incorporated

Personnel

Charts

Weekly charts

Weekly charts

Monthly charts

Year-end charts

Certifications and sales

Release history

See also
 List of most expensive music videos

References

Notes

Citations

Bibliography

2003 songs
2004 singles
Britney Spears songs
Songs about drugs
Music videos directed by Joseph Kahn
Canadian Singles Chart number-one singles
European Hot 100 Singles number-one singles
Number-one singles in Australia
Number-one singles in Austria
Number-one singles in the Czech Republic
Number-one singles in Hungary
Irish Singles Chart number-one singles
Number-one singles in Norway
Number-one singles in Portugal
Number-one singles in Scotland
UK Singles Chart number-one singles
Jive Records singles
Songs written by Cathy Dennis
Song recordings produced by Bloodshy & Avant
Songs written by Henrik Jonback
Songs written by Pontus Winnberg
Songs written by Christian Karlsson (DJ)
Grammy Award for Best Dance Recording
Breakbeat songs